Dominique Sarron (born 27 August 1959 in Riom, Puy-de-Dôme) is a former Grand Prix motorcycle road racer from France. His best year was in 1986 when he won the Brazilian Grand Prix and finished in third place in the 250cc world championship behind Carlos Lavado and Sito Pons. He won two races in 1988 riding for Honda and ended the season ranked fourth.

After his Grand Prix career, Sarron competed in the 1993 Superbike World Championship. He also competed in motorcycle endurance racing. He won the Suzuka 8 Hours in 1986 partnered with Wayne Gardner, and in 1989 partnered with Alex Vieira. He is the younger brother of Christian Sarron, also a Grand Prix motorcycle racer. In 1994, he teamed up with his brother to win the prestigious Bol d'or endurance race.

Motorcycle Grand Prix Results
Points system from 1969 to 1987:

Points system from 1988 to 1992:

(key) (Races in bold indicate pole position; races in italics indicate fastest lap)

References

1959 births
Living people
People from Riom
French motorcycle racers
250cc World Championship riders
500cc World Championship riders
Superbike World Championship riders
Sportspeople from Puy-de-Dôme